Kuru Kuru may refer to:

 Kuru Kuru Kururin, a puzzle video game for the Game Boy Advance console
 Kuru Kururu, the first and largest village on the Soesdyke-Linden Highway in Guyana